Anton Ulrich, Duke of Saxe-Meiningen (Meiningen, 22 October 1687 – Frankfurt, 27 January 1763), was Duke of Saxe-Meiningen from 1746 to 1763.

Life
Anton Ulrich was born on 22 October 1687 at Meiningen. He was the second but first surviving son (in order of birth he was the eighth) of Bernhard I, Duke of Saxe-Meiningen and his second wife, Elisabeth Eleonore of Brunswick-Wolfenbüttel.

When his father died in 1706, according to his will the duchy was not supposed to be divided among his heirs. However, due to the lack of a primogeniture rule, his three sons had to govern jointly: Anton Ulrich and his two older half-brothers, Ernst Ludwig and Friedrich Wilhelm. This resulted in conflict between Ernst Ludwig I and Anton Ulrich until the former died in 1724. Chaos continued, though, as now Friedrich Wilhelm and Anton Ulrich issued conflicting decrees.

Anton Ulrich had secretly married morganatically in the Netherlands in 1711 and lived in Amsterdam for much of the time. Since Anton Ulrich's aunt on his mother's side was the wife of Emperor Karl VI he made some progress in his attempts to make his offspring entitled to inherit. After Karl VI died, under Charles VII Anton Ulrich's ten children were found to be disqualified to succeed in 1744. Earlier that year, Philippine Elisabeth Caesar, Anton Ulrich's wife, had died. In 1746, Friedrich Wilhelm died, and Anton Ulrich was now the only Duke of Saxe-Meiningen. Although his relatives at Weimar and Gotha were already discussing the division of Saxe-Meiningen after his death, Anton Ulrich married again and succeeded in fathering another eight children - all of them eligible for inheritance.

Immediately after he inherited the duchy, Anton Ulrich left Meiningen and established his official residence at Frankfurt, where he lived until his death on 27 January 1763.

Marriages
In January 1711, Anton Ulrich secretly married Philippine Elisabeth Caesar, the lady-in-waiting of his favourite sister, Elisabeth Ernestine. This marriage was unequal, but she was created Princess in 1727. They had ten children, all created Prince/Princess of Saxe-Meiningen (Fürst/Fürstin):
Princess Philippine Antoinette of Saxe-Meiningen (b.1 August 1712 – d. Meiningen, 21 January 1785).
Princess Philippine Elisabeth of Saxe-Meiningen (b. 10 September 1713 – d. Meiningen, 18 March 1781).
Princess Philippine Louise of Saxe-Meiningen (b. 10 October 1714 – d. Meiningen, 25 October 1771).
Princess Philippine Wilhelmine of Saxe-Meiningen (b. 11 October 1715 – d. 1718).
Prince Bernhard Ernst of Saxe-Meiningen (b. 14 December 1716 – d. Meiningen, 14 June 1778).
Princess Antonie Augusta of Saxe-Meiningen (b. 29 December 1717 – d. Meiningen, 19 September 1768).
Princess Sophie Wilhelmine of Saxe-Meiningen (b. 23 February 1719 – d. 24 November 1723).
Prince Karl Ludwig of Saxe-Meiningen (b. 30 October 1721 – d. May 1727).
Princess Christine Friederike of Saxe-Meiningen (b. 13 December 1723 – d. within days).
Prince Friedrich Ferdinand of Saxe-Meiningen (b. 12 March 1725 – d. 17 June 1725).

In Bad Homburg vor der Höhe on 26 September 1750, Anton Ulrich married Charlotte Amalie of Hesse-Philippsthal, who was forty-three years his junior. They had eight children:
Princess Marie Charlotte Amalie Ernestine Wilhelmine Philippine of Saxe-Meiningen (b. Frankfurt, 11 September 1751 – d. Genoa, 25 April 1827); married on 21 March 1769 Ernest II, Duke of Saxe-Gotha-Altenburg.
Princess Wilhelmine Louise Christiane of Saxe-Meiningen (b. Frankfurt, 6 August 1752 – d. Kassel, 3 June 1805), married on 18 October 1781 to Adolph, Landgrave of Hesse-Philippsthal-Barchfeld.
Princess Elisabeth Sophia Wilhelmine Fredericka of Saxe-Meiningen (b. Frankfurt, 11 September 1753 – d. Frankfurt, 3 February 1754).
 Prince Karl Wilhelm of Saxe-Meiningen (b. Frankfurt, 19 November 1754 – d. Sonneberg, 21 July 1782).
Prince Friedrich Franz Ernst Ludwig of Saxe-Meiningen (b. Frankfurt, 16 March 1756 – d. Frankfurt, 25 March 1761).
Prince Friedrich Wilhelm of Saxe-Meiningen (b. Frankfurt, 18 May 1757 – d. Frankfurt, 13 April 1758).
Georg I, Duke of Saxe-Meiningen (b. Frankfurt, 4 February 1761 – d. Meiningen, 24 December 1803).
Princess Amalie Auguste Caroline Luise of Saxe-Meiningen (b. Frankfurt, 4 March 1762 – d. Carolath, 28 May 1798); married on 10 February 1783 Henry Charles Erdmann, Prince of Carolath-Beuthen.

Ancestors

See also
 Altenstein Palace

References

1687 births
1763 deaths
House of Saxe-Meiningen
Dukes of Saxe-Meiningen
People from Meiningen
Princes of Saxe-Meiningen
Recipients of the Order of the White Eagle (Poland)